Phyu Gyi was a well-known Burmese boxer from Burma. He is a former multiple-time flag champion.

Lethwei career 
In March 1957, Phyu Gyi participated in an event at Aung San Stadium alongside boxers such as Toe Lone, Pyi Taw Sein and Pann Ta Pwint. It was organized by the Shwe Sunn Nyo Boxing Promotion Association and was notable because some of the fights would include new rules, to match international standards. This meant the wearing of gloves, no timeout, and no kicks, knees or headbutts were allowed. The event was well attended by fans and officials but the matches under the new rules were no success as the boxers were too tired and fought awkwardly due to the heavy gloves.

On December 26, 1959, it was announced that Phyu Gyi would participate in the flag tournament for the 12th anniversary of Independence in Rangoon starting on January 4. The event would feature both professional boxing, with members of the Burmese national boxing team, and Burmese boxing.

In September 1960 around 20 boxers joined other sports teams as part of a cultural mission on a trip to China. They fought in 10 cities including Beijing. They were part of another trade mission and a delegation that consisted of Prime Minister U Nu, General Ne Win and defence staff who were there to sign a Sino-Burmese boundary treaty with Chinese Premier Zhou Enlai. In an interview with Starlight magazine in the 90's boxer Abyauk recalled the following boxers on the trip: Bo Sein, Maung Dway, Phyu Gyi, Phyu Lay, Shu Ma Wa, Bo Kyaw, Kyaung Thar Gyi, Sein Lone, Maung Lone, Toe Lone, One Dollar, Taw Thar Lay, Taing Lone Kyaw and Okkalar Daung.

In December 1964, Kyar Ba Nyein was once again tasked with bringing famous boxers to Rangoon for the 17th anniversary of Independence. The event was held at Kennedy Island from January 3 to January 8, 1965. A December 27 article in Light of Burma reported that Pat Lone (Kyondoe), Phyu Gyi (Thaton), Toe Lone, Maung Lone & Sein Lone (Mawlamyine) among many others would participate. Phyu Gyi defeated Bo Kalay on January 5, and eventually faced Sein Lone in the finals on January 9.

From February 26th to March 4th 1965, a flag tournament celebrating Peasants' Day took place at Rangoon Kyaikkasan Stadium. In the finals of the tournament Phyu Gyi defeated Toe Lone from Mawlamyine for a cash prize of 500Kyats.

From January 3rd to January 8th 1966, an event at Kennedy Island celebrating the 18th anniversary of Independence took place in Rangoon. It was announced that both Phyu Gyi and Tine Lone Kyaw would both bring in a group of boxers to participate. Phyu Gyi, contesting for the first class flag himself, had a match with Patma Sein on January 5.

At the Shwemawdaw Pagoda festival in Pegu from April 1st to April 8th 1966, both western (English) boxing and Burmese boxing were on display. Well-known boxers Chit Sayar, Phyu Gyi, Phyu Lay, Shu Ma Wa, Tin Shwe, Hla Shwe, Patma Sein and Talaing Sein participated alongside Kyaung Thar who had won the "trophy" previously in 1965. At the event a Sports Committee took the opportunity to speak with the participating boxers on how to preserve Burmese boxing culture and achieve a higher standard for the sport among other things. Their report was submitted to the Yangon Sports and Physical Education Committee.

For the 1966 May Day festivities from April 26th until May 1st, the Sports and Physical Education Committee organized an event at Kyaikkasan Stadium. This was the first edition of the Labour Day event, and was added to current recurring annual events (Independence Day, Peasants' Day & Union Day) to promote Burmese boxing. Phyu Gyi and Phyu Kalay from Thaton, Maung Lone and Sein Lone from Khayar village & One Dollar and Mae Gyi from Win Ka Mawt village were challenged by next generation first class boxers like Hla Shwe (Pwe Tine Kyaw), Tin Shwe Gyi (Luu Ma Yway) and Kyaung Thar (Hpa-an). It is known that Phyu Gyi faced Sein Lay Tin from second class in one of the preliminary matches, but did not end up winning the flag on May 1. That honour went to Hla Shwe who was promoted to first class this year.

On December 29, 1969, Kyar Ba Nyein visited Mawlamyine, Thaton and Hpa-an to mobilise boxers from the southeastern region for participation in the upcoming Independence Day event. Phyu Gyi, Hla Shwe, Kyaung Thar, Sein Lone, Moe Kyoe, Chit Sayar, Myawaddy Than Shwe, Aung Myint Sein and others took part. The event was held at Thein Pyu Stadium in Rangoon.

Personal life 
Phyu Gyi was the son of wrestler U Gani and Daw Saw She. He was a muslim and had seven children. Three of them also enjoyed a boxing career, of which Tun Win a.k.a. Shwe War Tun is the most notable. The 1963 second class and 1967 first class Independence Day flag champion Phyu Lay, sometimes referred to as Phyu Kalay, is the younger brother of Phyu Gyi. He died of old age at the age of 71 in his hometown Thaton.

Titles and accomplishments 
 Tournaments
 First class flag champion; Peasants' Day (March 1965)
 First class flag champion; 17th anniversary of Independence (January 1965)

Lethwei record 

|- style="background:#fff;"
| 1966-04-29 ||  || align="left" | Sein Lay Tin (Win Ka Mawt) || May Day (Labor Day), Kyaikkasan Stadium || Rangoon, Burma ||  ||  || 
|- style="background:#cfc;"
| 1966-01-05 || Win || align="left" | Patma Sein (Hpar Kat) || Independence Day, Kennedy Island || Rangoon, Burma || KO ||  || 
|- style="background:#cfc;"
| 1965-03-04 || Win || align="left" | Toe Lone (Mawlamyine) || Peasants' Day, Kyaikkasan Stadium || Rangoon, Burma || KO ||  || 
|- style="background:#cfc;"
| 1965-01-09 || Win || align="left" | Sein Lone (Mawlamyine) || Independence Day, Kennedy Island || Rangoon, Burma || KO ||  || 
|- style="background:#cfc;"
| 1965-01-05 || Win || align="left" | Bo Kalay || Independence Day, Kennedy Island || Rangoon, Burma || KO ||  ||
|- style="background:#fff;"
| 1957-03-09 ||  || align="left" |  || Challenge fights, Aung San Stadium || Rangoon, Burma ||  ||  ||
|-

References

Burmese Lethwei practitioners